Jaglal Chaudhary College is a degree college in Chhapra, Bihar, India. It is a constituent unit of Jai Prakash University. The college offers intermediate and three years degree course (TDC) in arts and science.

History 
The college was established in the year 1970.

Departments 

 Arts
 Sanskrit
 Hindi
 Urdu
  English
 Philosophy
 Economics
 Political Science
 History
 Psychology
 Science
 Mathematics
 Physics
 Chemistry
 Zoology
 Botany

References

External links 

 Jai Prakash University website 

Colleges in India
Constituent colleges of Jai Prakash University
Educational institutions established in 1970
1970 establishments in Bihar